Sunset Country is a desert situated in remote north-west Victoria in the Sunraysia region. By road, the area is about 4 kilometres north from Manya and 30 kilometres south from Berrook.

Sunset Country is near the south-west corner of the Murray-Sunset National Park.

References

Deserts of Victoria (Australia)